The MHV 900 Class is the Danish Home Guard's newest ship class. It is a further development of the MHV 800 class and is about 3.50 meters longer and several tons heavier. The increased size allows the ship class to carry 2 float locks of 180 meters, which gives the Danish pollution preparedness a noticeable lift upward. In addition, the class is equipped with several fire pumps and a water cannon, so it can also be added to fire fighting. The ships are part of the Navy's normal task complex.

References

 
Patrol boat classes